Linnaeus's mouse opossum (Marmosa murina), also known as the common or  murine mouse opossum, is a South American marsupial of the family Didelphidae.

Range and habitat
Its range includes Colombia, Mexico, Venezuela, Trinidad and Tobago, Guyana, Suriname, French Guiana, Brazil, eastern Ecuador, eastern Peru, and eastern Bolivia.

This opossum is most commonly sighted near forest streams and human habitation. A nocturnal creature, it shelters during the day in a mesh of twigs on a tree branch, a tree hole, or an old bird's nest.

Behavior
It eats insects, spiders, lizards, bird's eggs, chicks, and fruits.

Linnaeus's mouse opossum has a gestation period of approximately 13 days, and gives birth to 5–10 young.

The mouse opossum will "play dead" if it thinks that it is in danger, it will even smell as if it were dead.

Description
It is pale beige to grey on its underparts with short, smooth fur. Its face appears to have a black mask on it, its eyes are prominent, and its ears are very upright. Its tail, which females use to carry leaves, is much longer than the rest of its body.

References

Opossums
Marsupials of South America
Mammals of Brazil
Mammals of Bolivia
Mammals of Ecuador
Mammals of French Guiana
Mammals of Suriname
Mammals of Peru
Mammals of Colombia
Mammals of Trinidad and Tobago
Mammals of the Caribbean
Mammals described in 1758
Taxa named by Carl Linnaeus